General Nash may refer to:

Francis Nash (c. 1742–1777), Continental Army brigadier general in the American Revolutionary War
Richard C. Nash (born 1950), U.S. Army National Guard brevet lieutenant general
William L. Nash (fl. 1990s–2000s), U.S. Army major general